Yelase is a village in Mawal taluka of Pune district in the state of Maharashtra, India.

Administration
The village is administrated by a sarpanch, an elected representative who leads a gram panchayat. In 2019, the village was itself the seat of a gram panchayat.

Demographics
At the 2011 Census of India, the village comprised 230 households. The population of 1248 was split between 636 males and 612 females.

See also
List of villages in Mawal taluka

References

Villages in Mawal taluka